Pseudomonas caricapapayae is a Gram-negative soil bacterium that is pathogenic to plants. It was originally isolated on papaya (Carica papaya) in Brazil. Based on 16S rRNA analysis, P. caricapapayae has been placed in the P. syringae group.

References

External links
 Type strain of Pseudomonas caricapapayae at BacDive -  the Bacterial Diversity Metadatabase

Pseudomonadales
Bacterial plant pathogens and diseases
Papaya tree diseases
Bacteria described in 1956